Yor-El Francis is a Liberian–American filmmaker and film producer. He is most notable as the director of critically acclaimed award-winning film Murder in the Cassava Patch.

Personal life
He was born in Monrovia, Liberia to a prominent Liberian family; the Martins of Grand Bassa County and the Francis from Marshall. He first attended the Hilton Van Ee School and then American Cooperative School for primary education. Later he attended the Sierra Leone Grammar School in Freetown, Sierra Leone to complete his secondary education. His father owned companies in Ghana, Haiti, Liberia, Sierra Leone, California and Miami and meanwhile, his mother owned a boutique in Monrovia.

Career
After secondary education, he moved to USA with his family and settled in New York City. Then he attended to Hunter College, a liberal arts school on Manhattan's Upper East and studied film and interned at MTV Networks. Later, he obtained a Master of Arts in Film Directing from the City University of New York. In 2003, he was included into the two-year Directors Guild of America's Producer Training Plan.

First he joined as an intern at MTV Networks, then moved to the Black Entertainment Television [BET], before landing a job at FOX. He started film career as an Assistant Director on motion pictures, television and commercials. He involved as a second assistant director for many televisions serials and films including: The West Wing (1999), NCIS (2003), The Closer (2005), Crank (2006) Brothers & Sisters (2006) Zeke and Luther (2009). In 2005, he won the African Film Commission's top prize for screen-writing for his screenplay Piankhi, the Prince of Egypt.

In 2012, he made his maiden feature film, Murder in the Cassava Patch, which is based on his native Liberia. During his visit to Liberia for the film, he met Peter Ballah, with whom he started to produce the film. Later in the film, his entire cast became the children of Ballah.

Filmography
 Never Too Late (second assistant director) 2020
 The House Next Door (second assistant director) (post-production) 2016 
 New Day, Same Time (Short) (first assistant director) (completed) 2020 
 American Soul (TV Series) (second assistant director - 2 episodes) 2019 
 Dolly Parton's Heartstrings (TV Series) (second assistant director - 1 episode)
 The Best of Enemies (first assistant director) 2017-2018
 The Quad (TV Series) (Key Second Assistant Director - 8 episodes)
 All Eyez on Me (second second assistant director) 2016
 Dolly Parton's Christmas of Many Colors: Circle of Love (TV Movie) (second assistant director) 2016
 Barbershop: The Next Cut (second second assistant director) 2015
 Dolly Parton's Coat of Many Colors (TV Movie) (second second assistant director) 2013-2015
 Love Thy Neighbor (TV Series) (second assistant director - 4 episodes)
 If Loving You Is Wrong (TV Series) (additional second assistant director - 20 episodes) 2015
 Hindsight (TV Series) (second assistant director - 10 episodes) 2014
 David Blaine: Real or Magic (TV Movie documentary) (additional camera operator) 2013
 Constantine (TV Series) (second second assistant director - 3 episodes) 2011-2012
 Murder in the Cassava Patch (Film) (Director, producer, writer) 2012
 Zeke and Luther (TV Series) (second assistant director - 26 episodes) 2011
 Porn for Dinner (Short) (first assistant director)
 Brothers & Sisters (TV Series) (second second assistant director - 40 episodes, 2006 - 2009)
 My Name Is Earl (TV Series) (additional second assistant director - 1 episode) 2006
 Dreamgirls (additional second second assistant director) 2006
 Crank (second second assistant director) 2005
 Close to Home (TV Series) (trainee assistant director) 2005
 Night Stalker (TV Series) (trainee assistant director) 2005
 The Dukes of Hazzard (trainee assistant director - uncredited) 2005
 Numb3rs (TV Series) (trainee assistant director - pilot) 2004
 Century City (TV Series) (dga trainee) 2003
 Cold Case (TV Series) (day player DGA trainee) 2003
 Joan of Arcadia (TV Series) (day player DGA trainee) 2003
 NCIS (TV Series) (dga trainee) 1996
 7th Heaven (TV Series) (trainee assistant director) 1995
 JAG (TV Series) (DGA trainee day player - 1 episode)

References

External links

Living people
American film directors
American film producers
California State University, Fresno alumni
Year of birth missing (living people)